Kathryn Aselton (born October 1, 1978) is an American actress, film director and producer. She directed and co-starred in The Freebie, which was shown in the non-competition "Next" category at the Sundance Film Festival in 2010. She also starred in the FX sitcom The League for its seven-season run from 2009 to 2015, and in the first two seasons of FX's Marvel Comics X-Men drama Legion.

Early life
Aselton was born in Milbridge, Maine. She competed in pageants in 1995, and was Miss Maine Teen USA 1995 and first runner-up at Miss Teen USA 1995. She graduated from Narraguagus High School in Harrington, Maine, in 1996. She attended Boston University School of Communications for two years before moving to Los Angeles to act, where she met her future husband, Mark Duplass. She then studied for two years at the American Academy of Dramatic Arts in New York.

Career
In 2004, Aselton appeared in a short film titled Scrapple opposite Mark Duplass and his brother Jay Duplass who also wrote and directed the short. Aselton made her feature-length film debut in The Puffy Chair opposite Mark Duplass, who directed the film alongside his brother Jay. The film premiered at Sundance in January 2005 and was released on June 2, 2006, in a limited release. That same year, Aselton appeared opposite Steve Zissis in the short film "The Intervention". In 2009, after a break from acting, Aselton appeared in an episode of The Office. That same year, she appeared in Easier with Practice, "Other People's Parties", and "Feed the Fish". In 2016, Aselton appeared in Togetherness, an HBO original series created by her husband and her brother in law, as Anna. That same year, she was cast in a recurring role in the second season of Casual as Jennifer. Aselton also starred in Fun Mom Dinner opposite Molly Shannon and Toni Collette, directed by Alethea Jones. She was featured in an episode of Season 9 of Curb Your Enthusiasm as Jean the USPS Letter Carrier.

Personal life
Aselton is married to her The League co-star Mark Duplass. They have two daughters together, born in 2007 and 2012.

Filmography

Film

Television

References

External links

1978 births
21st-century American actresses
Actresses from Maine
American film actresses
American women film directors
American film producers
American television actresses
Boston University College of Communication alumni
Living people
People from Milbridge, Maine
American Academy of Dramatic Arts alumni
Beauty pageant contestants from Maine
1995 beauty pageant contestants
20th-century Miss Teen USA delegates
Film directors from Maine
American women film producers
20th-century American people